Neoplecostomus paraty is a species of catfish in the family Loricariidae. It is native to South America, where it is known from coastal streams in Serra da Bocaina National Park, near the municipality of Paraty in the state of Rio de Janeiro in Brazil. The species reaches at least 9.2 cm (3.6 inches) in standard length. It was described in 2017 by Arieli Matheus Cherobim (of São Paulo State University), Henrique Lazzarotto (of the Federal University of Rio de Janeiro), and Francisco Langeani (also of São Paulo State University) on the basis of its distinctive coloration and morphology. FishBase does not yet list this species.

References 

paraty
Fish described in 2017
Catfish of South America
Freshwater fish of Brazil